Moon Tae-il (born June 14, 1994), known mononymously as Taeil, is a South Korean singer. He is a member of the South Korean boy group NCT and its sub-units NCT U and NCT 127, managed by the label SM Entertainment. Taeil made his debut in April 2016 in the rotational unit NCT U and became a member of the Seoul-based unit NCT 127 in July 2016.

Early life 
Moon Tae-il was born on June 14, 1994, in Seoul, South Korea. He was accepted to the Applied Music program of Hanyang University, Gyeonggi; in 2013, the program was considered the most competitive early-admissions program in the country, topping law and medicine at other prestigious schools.

Career

2015–2018: Pre-debut and debut with NCT

On October 13, 2015, Taeil was introduced as a member of SM Entertainment's pre-debut training team, SM Rookies. On January 27, 2016, Taeil released "Because of You" as soundtrack for The Merchant: Gaekju 2015. On April 9, 2016, Taeil made his official debut as a member of NCT U, a subgroup of NCT, with the release of "Without You". Taeil later made his debut as a member of NCT 127, the second sub-unit of NCT, with the release of EP NCT #127 on July 7, 2016. 

On December 30, 2016, Taeil contributed vocals to "Sound of Your Heart", a collaboration song with other SM artists (Yesung, Sunny, Luna, Wendy, Seulgi and Doyoung as SM Town) and pianist Steve Barakatt. It was produced to commemorate the "SMTOWN GALA 2016, Sound of Magic" charity event, with sales of the songs donated to the Smile for U campaign and support music production for Vietnamese children. On August 7, 2017, Taeil released "Stay in My Life" with NCT U's Taeyong and Doyoung as a soundtrack for School 2017. Taeil and Doyoung later released "Radio Romance" as soundtrack for Radio Romance on January 30, 2018. 

On September 7, 2018, Taeil and NCT U's Jaehyun released "New Dream" as soundtrack for Dokgo Rewind. On March 30, 2019, Taeil was featured in Sohlhee's "Purple". Later in November, he appeared on King of Mask Singer under the nickname King Card.

2020–present: Solo activities and world record
On April 11, 2021, Taeil featured in Moon Su-jin's "The Moon". In May 2021, it was announced that Taeil would participate in Kim Min-ki's tribute album, titled Morning Dew 50th Anniversary Tribute Album. On June 6 the first part of the album, featuring "A Beautiful Human Being" sang by Taeil, was released. On June 28, the fourth part of the album, featuring "Morning Dew" sung by various artists including Taeil, was released. On July 6, 2021, Taeil opened an Instagram account and broke the Guinness World Record for "Fastest time to reach 1 million followers on Instagram", previously held by Rupert Grint since November 2020. On October 11, 2021, Taeil, along with Korean rapper Lil Boi, participated in labelmate Raiden's debut EP Love Right Back, with the title track of the same name. They promoted the release together on M Countdown and Inkigayo. On December 27, 2021, Taeil, alongside labelmates Onew and Kyuhyun, released the song "Ordinary Day" for SM Entertainment's winter album 2021 Winter SMTOWN: SMCU Express.

On February 13, 2022, Taeil released "Starlight" for the first part of the soundtrack for the South Korean television series Twenty-Five, Twenty-One. In December 2022, Taeil featured on "Happier", released as part of the album 2022 Winter SM Town: SMCU Palace alongside labelmates Kangta, Yesung, Suho, and groupmate Renjun. On February 9, 2023, Taeil released "Lovey Dovey" as the soundtrack of the South Korean romantic comedy series Love to Hate You.

Discography

Singles

Soundtrack appearances

Filmography

Television shows

Awards and nominations

World records

Notes

References

External links

 Moon Tae-il at SM Town

K-pop singers
21st-century South Korean singers
Living people
1994 births
NCT (band) members
SM Rookies members
Singers from Seoul